Anthony Ivor Colorito (born September 8, 1964) is a former football player for the Denver Broncos in the National Football League (NFL).

Biography
Colorito was born in Brooklyn, New York. He attended Midwood High School.

He then attended USC, where he was an All American in football for the USC Trojans, and was an all-conference selection in his final season.

He was drafted by the Denver Broncos in the fifth round of the 1986 NFL Draft. He played nose tackle. In 1986, he played in 15 games for the Broncos, made 18 tackles and had two fumble recoveries. His career ended early when he suffered a knee injury in a 1987 exhibition game.

References 

Living people
1964 births
Sportspeople from Brooklyn
Players of American football from New York City
American football defensive tackles
USC Trojans football players
Denver Broncos players